St. Ursula Catholic School or Sekolah Menengah Katolik Santa Ursula is an all-female Catholic school located in Jakarta, Indonesia. It is located next to Jakarta Cathedral and Filateli Post Office. The school has a branch in BSD, Tangerang.  After its initial establishment as an Ursuline Convent in 1859, the Ursulines established the Prinses Juliana School in Batavia in 1912. At present, the school is known as St. Ursula Catholic School.

History

The Order of St. Ursula from Rotterdam was the first of the many groups of sisters who entered the Dutch Indies. In 1858 they founded a convent by the name of Ursulinen Klooster, with their first convent in Nordwijk (Jalan Juanda) named St. Mary Convent. A year later the first convent located in Noordwijk became overcrowded and some activities were moved to a bigger house in Postweg (Jalan Pos). A new building was eventually developed and became known as Kleine Klooster ("small cloister"), to distinguish it from the older Saint Mary's convent, known as Groote klooster ("big cloister").

A Neogothic chapel was later added in 1888 and finally the Prinses Juliana School in 1912. After the independence of Indonesia, the school became known as St. Ursula Catholic School.

Facility

The school consists of a kindergarten, elementary school, junior high school, and high school. The kindergarten and elementary school are co-educational. St. Ursula junior high school and high school in Jakarta only admits female students, while St. Ursula BSD are co-educational.

Co-curricular activities 
Co-curricular activities in St. Ursula High School are divided into intra-curricular and extracurricular activities.

Intra-curricular 
The intra-curricular activities are mandatory. There are two categories: foreign languages and humanities, and students are required to take one from each category.

Foreign languages 
 Japanese
 English
 Korean
 Mandarin
 French
 German
 Dutch

Humanities 

 Vocal group
 Javanese Gamelan
 Graphic design
 Angklung
 Fashion design
 Photography
 Beauty
 Handicraft
 Balinese Gamelan
 Kolintang
 Painting
 Cooking
 Pergamano
 Cinematography
 Modern/Traditional dance
 Tatting

Extracurricular 
Extracurricular activities are optional, but students are allowed to take any as they wish as long as they're willing to commit for at least one academic year.

Available activities 

 TOEFL
 Band
 Basketball
 Cheerleaders
 Volleyball
 Modern dance
 Intensive German
 Futsal
 Marching brass
 Badminton
 Choir
 Youth science group
 Match club
 Programming
 English debate
 Self defense
 Cross Culture

Notable alumnae 
 Astrid Susanto
 Judith Dipodiputro
 Meutia Hatta
 Nurmala Kartini Sjahrir
 The Sacred Riana

See also

 St. Ursula School Bumi Serpong Damai
 List of colonial buildings and structures in Jakarta

References

Schools in Indonesia
Catholic schools in Indonesia
Schools in Jakarta